Kean: Genius or Scoundrel (Italian: Kean - Genio e sregolatezza) is a 1956 Italian historical biographical film co-written, directed by and starring Vittorio Gassman. It also features Eleonora Rossi Drago, Gérard Landry and Valentina Cortese A dramatization of the life of nineteenth century actor Edmund Kean, it is based on the drama play Kean (1836) by Alexandre Dumas and its 1953 adaptation with the same name by Jean-Paul Sartre. It was Gassman's first film as director. It was screened at the Locarno Film Festival in 1957.

The film's sets were designed by the art director Gianni Polidori. Much of the film was shot at the Teatro Valle in Rome.

Plot 
In 19th century London, Edmund Kean was an adored Shakespearean comedian. An inveterate Don Juan, he amuses good London society with his eloquence and his wit. Eléna, the charming wife of the Danish ambassador, is in love with the actor. The Prince of Wales learns that this emotion is mutual, and offers her to give up this idyll for a large sum of money. But soon, Kean falls in love with Anna, a young but promising first actress.

Cast 
Vittorio Gassman as   Edmund Kean
Eleonora Rossi Drago as Countess  Elena Koefeld
Anna Maria Ferrero as Anna Damby
Valentina Cortese as Fanny
Helmut Dantine as Lord Mewill
Carlo Mazzarella as Dario
Cesco Baseggio as Salomon
Nerio Bernardi as Count  Koefeld
Mario Carotenuto as Peter Patt
 Dina Sassoli as Amy 
 Bianca Maria Fabbri as Prima attrice 
 Amedeo Girardi as Bob
 Pietro Tordi as Cochrane

References

Bibliography
 Moliterno, Gino. The A to Z of Italian Cinema. Scarecrow Press, 2009.

External links

1956 films
1950s biographical films
Italian biographical films
Films based on works by Alexandre Dumas
Films directed by Vittorio Gassman
Biographical films about actors
Films with screenplays by Suso Cecchi d'Amico
Italian films based on plays
Films set in London
Films set in the 19th century
Italian historical films
1950s historical films
Lux Film films
1956 directorial debut films
1950s Italian films